Lubja is a village in Viimsi Parish, Harju County in northern Estonia.

References

Villages in Harju County